Riddhi Narasimha Malla, also spelled Hridinarasimha, (Nepali: ऋद्धिनरसिंह मल्ल) was a Malla dynasty king and the King of Patan. He succeeded Vira Mahindra Malla and reigned from 1715 until his death in 1717.

Life 
Riddhi Narasimha was the son of Rudrendra Malla and the grandson of Rudramati, the sister of Yoga Narendra Malla. He was a religious kings and donated various items to religious places.

Succession 
After the death of Riddhi Narasimha in 1717, there were no any legitimate heirs. The Kajis of Patan wanted Ranajit Malla, the then heir apparent of Bhadgaon, to take over as the King of Patan. Due to the influence of Yogamati, Bhaskara Malla of Kantipur was proclaimed as the king. Bhaskara Malla reigned as Mahindrasimha Malla in Patan.

References 

18th-century Nepalese people
Nepalese monarchs
1717 deaths